Paul Högberg (30 October 1911 – 19 February 1999) was a Swedish sports administrator who served as the third President of International Handball Federation (IHF) from 1972 to 1984. 

He was also the President of Swedish Handball Federation from 1948 to 1967. He died on 19 February 1999.

References

1911 births
1999 deaths
G
International Handball Federation
Swedish sports executives and administrators